Saint-Quentin-en-Yvelines is a new town and an agglomeration community in the French department of Yvelines. It is one of the original five villes nouvelles (new towns) of Paris and was named after the Saint Quentin Pond, which was chosen to become the town's centre. The town was built from a greenfield site starting in the 1960s. Its area is 119.2 km2. In 2018, Saint-Quentin-en-Yvelines had a population of 228,312.

Administrative divisions
The communauté d'agglomération comprises 12 communes:

Les Clayes-sous-Bois
Coignières
Élancourt
Guyancourt
Magny-les-Hameaux
Maurepas
Montigny-le-Bretonneux
Plaisir
Trappes
La Verrière
Villepreux
Voisins-le-Bretonneux

Of these communes, Montigny-le-Bretonneux is the most centrally located and has the largest population. The 2 most importants communes are Trappes and Montigny.

Demographics

Its president is Jean-Michel Fourgous.

Until 2019, Saint-Quentin-en-Yvelines served as the start and finish point of the famous Paris–Brest–Paris bicycling endurance event.

Economy
Europcar has its head office in the business park of Val Saint-Quentin at Voisins-le-Bretonneux. It previously had its head office in the Immeuble Les Quadrants in Saint-Quentin-en-Yvelines.

At one time Bouygues had its head office in the Kevin Roche-designed Challenger complex in Saint-Quentin-en-Yvelines. It is now occupied by Bouygues Construction, one of the group's subsidiaries.

Le Golf National is a private golf course in Saint-Quentin. It is hosting the 2018 Ryder Cup.

Sport

The city has a velodrome, the Vélodrome de Saint-Quentin-en-Yvelines. It was built between 2011 and 2014 and hosted the 2015 UCI Track Cycling World Championships and the 2016 UEC European Track Championships. Next to the velodrome is also a BMX track.

Between 1991 and 2015, Saint-Quentin-en-Yvelines was the start and finish location for the Paris-Brest-Paris randonnée.

Education

Universities:
 Versailles Saint-Quentin-en-Yvelines University

Senior high schools/sixth form colleges:
Lycée les Sept Mares (Maurepas)
Lycée Sonia Delaunay (Villepreux)
Lycée Dumont d'Urville (Maurepas)
Lycée Descartes de Montigny le Bretonneux
Lycée des métiers Louis Blériot (Trappes)

Lycée des métiers Henri Matisse (Trappes)
Lycée de la Plaine de Neauphle (Trappes)
Lycée de Villaroy (Guyancourt)
Lycée Jean-Vilar (Plaisir)

International schools:
Institut culturel franco-japonais (Montigny-le-Bretonneux)

References

External links

 The communauté d'agglomérations website (in English)
 The communauté d'agglomérations website (in French)

 
Populated places established in the 1960s
Agglomeration communities in France
Intercommunalities of Yvelines
New towns in Île-de-France
New towns started in the 1960s